The California coastal sage and chaparral is a Mediterranean forests, woodlands, and scrub ecoregion located in southwestern California (United States) and northwestern Baja California (Mexico). It is part of the larger California chaparral and woodlands ecoregion.

Geography
This includes the southwestern slopes of the Transverse and Peninsular Ranges, the entirety of the Santa Susana and Santa Monica Mountains, the Channel Islands, Guadalupe Island, and Cedros Island.

Major urban centers located within this ecoregion include Greater Los Angeles, San Diego-Tijuana, Ensenada, and Tecate.

Climate
The climate is Mediterranean, with mild, wet winters and hot, dry summers with fog.

Flora
The plant species of the California coastal sage and chaparral ecoregion are diverse, with high endemism. The main plant communities are coastal sage scrub, California coastal prairie, chaparral, southern oak woodland, pine forests, riparian woodland, and wetlands.

Coast

Prominent coast adjacent species include: California sagebrush (Artemisia californica) and brittlebush (Encelia californica), along with California buckwheat (Eriogonum fasciculatum) and Munz's sage (Salvia munzii).

At the southern areas of this coastal ecoregion, cacti and succulents can be found, such as: Shaw's agave (Agave shawii), coastal dudleya (Dudleya caespitosa), coastal cholla (Cylindropuntia prolifera), golden cereus (Bergerocactus emoryi), and other prickly pear (Opuntia), Yucca and Dudleya species.

Some of the endemic plants to the ecoregion's southern coast zone include: San Diego thornmint (Acanthomintha ilicifolia), San Diego ambrosia (Ambrosia pumila) and San Diego barrel cactus (Ferocactus viridescens).

Slopes
Higher up from the shoreline the slopes are densely covered in chaparral shrubs, such as: chamise (Adenostoma fasciculatum), and many California lilac (Ceanothus) and manzanita (Arctostaphylos) species. Chaparral yucca (Hesperoyucca whipplei) is commonplace throughout the climate zone.

Trees

Still higher are mountain conifers such as the huge sugar pine (Pinus lambertiana), ponderosa pine (Pinus ponderosa), Jeffrey pine (Pinus jeffreyi), Coulter pine (Pinus coulteri), and incense cedar (Calocedrus decurrens). Endemic cypress (Cupressus) species include: the Monterey cypress (Cupressus macrocarpa), Gowen cypress (Cupressus goveniana), and Sargent's cypress (Cupressus sargentii).

Another endemic tree is the rare Torrey pine (Pinus torreyana), which is only native to the coastal bluffs in Torrey Pines State Reserve near San Diego, and off the coast on Santa Rosa Island.

Riparian canyon bottoms can have California sycamores (Platanus racemosa). California oak woodlands are at many elevations in less xeric locations, with species such as the coast live oak (Quercus agrifolia). Valley oaks (Quercus lobata) once covered the adjacent sheltered plains, such in the Los Angeles basin and San Fernando Valley.

Southern California black walnut (Juglans californica) remnant populations are on some north faces of the Santa Monica Mountains, Santa Susana Mountains, and the San Jose Hills.

Channel Islands
The Channel Islands are mostly covered in coastal sage and chamise chaparral with some oak woodland including endemic and/or rare: buckwheats (Eriogonum spp.), oaks (such as island oak—Quercus tomentella), and Dudleya species restricted to these islands.

Other habitats
In and around these different habitats this diverse ecoregion also contains 'patches' of stream-riverside riparian zone oak-sycamore woodlands, native and introduced species grasslands, and serpentine barrens. Seasonal wetland habitats include intermittent creeks, ponds, vernal pools, and floodplains. 
 
Wildfires are part of the natural fire ecology throughout the ecoregion. Habitats of this hot, dry coast must survive and revive following the regular forest fires, and the dominant plant species have adapted to do that.

Fauna

The coastal sage and chaparral of California are home to a variety of herbivores, such as California mule deer and southern mule deer, to predators such as American black bear, bobcats, cougars, coyotes, and gray fox. Other small mammals include San Diego pocket mouse, Stephens' kangaroo rat (Dipodomys stephensi), and Merriam's kangaroo rat.

Reptiles of note include Sagebrush lizards, western fence lizards, the San Diego subspecies of the coast horned lizard, and the western banded gecko (Coleonyx variegatus). Resident snake species include the rosy boa, red-diamond rattlesnake (Crotalus ruber), and western patch-nosed snake (Salvadora hexalepis).

Invertebrates of note include the cheese-weed moth lacewing (Chrysoperla species). The Hermes copper and Quino checkerspot butterflies among the 200 butterfly species found here.

Vernal pools in the ecoregion are home to Riverside fairy shrimp (Streptocephalus woottoni).

Birds
The California gnatcatcher is a small bird, endemic to this coastal ecoregion, which has been protected as its habitat is now designated an Important Bird Area. Other birds found here are the endemic Nutall's woodpecker (Picoides nuttallii) of the oak woodland, and the coastal populations of the protected cactus wren (Campylorhynchus brunneicapillus).

Important Bird Areas in Mexico include Isla Guadalupe and Isla Cedros, and parts of Sierra de Juárez and Sierra de San Pedro Mártir.

Threats and preservation

This attractive coastline is highly vulnerable to urban, recreational, and agricultural development and only 15% of original habitat is intact. Habitats are vulnerable to livestock grazing, which has removed much native vegetation on the Channel Islands, such as Santa Cruz where sheep were grazed for over 100 years.

Another threat, ironically, is fire control, which only allows the amount of dry material in the forest to build up, resulting eventually in massive fires. However, in many chaparral regions such as the Santa Monica Mountains, increased fire frequency is the larger concern because fire return intervals in mature chaparral communities should be 30–150 years, unlike much of the region which often has return intervals of 20 years or less.

There are patches of coastal sage scrub in Marine Corps Base Camp Pendleton, the Santa Monica Mountains, the San Joaquin Hills near Laguna Beach, and the Irvine Ranch in Orange County, California. Additional patches of coastal sage scrub exist in Southern California in the Angeles National Forest.

Protected areas
A 2017 assessment found that 1,925 km², or 6%, of the ecoregion is in protected areas. Protected areas include Channel Islands National Park, Santa Monica Mountains National Recreation Area, Point Mugu State Park, Malibu Creek State Park, Topanga State Park, Griffith Park, Santa Susana Pass State Historic Park, Ballona Wetlands State Ecological Reserve, Chino Hills State Park, Crystal Cove State Park, the Santa Rosa Plateau Reserve, and Torrey Pines State Reserve.

In Baja California, the chaparral ecology of Guadalupe Island, Isla Todos Santos, and the Coronado Islands are protected within the Baja California Pacific Islands Marine Conservation Area.

See also
List of ecoregions in Mexico
List of ecoregions in the United States (WWF)
Southern California Bight

External links

References

California chaparral and woodlands
Ecoregions of California
Plant communities of California
Ecoregions of Mexico
Natural history of Baja California
Nearctic ecoregions
Sclerophyll forests